Louis Joseph Delaporte, often known as Louis Delaporte (22 October 1874 - February 1944) was a French archaeologist and Hittitologist.

Louis Delaporte was born in Saint-Hilaire-du-Harcouët. He died in  prison in Silesia in February 1944.

Works
 Mesopotamia : the Babylonian and Assyrian civilization. Translated by V. Gordon Childe. 1925.
 Les Hittites (Paris: Renaissance du Livre, 1936).

References

French archaeologists
French Assyriologists
Hittitologists
1874 births
1924 deaths